Viktor Georgevich Demidenko (born 6 June 1962) is a Soviet and Russian former road cyclist. He most notably won a stage of the 1986 Vuelta a España.

Major results

1979
 1st  Team time trial, UCI Junior Road World Championships
1980
 1st  Team time trial, UCI Junior Road World Championships
 1st Overall Giro della Lunigiana
1st Stages 2 & 3 (ITT)
1981
 1st  Stage race, Soviet National Road Championships
1982
 1st  Team time trial, Soviet National Road Championships
 2nd Overall Giro delle Regioni
1st Stage 2
 3rd Overall Coors Classic
1st Stage 12
 10th Overall Circuit Cycliste Sarthe
1983
 2nd Overall Ruban Granitier Breton
 3rd Overall Giro Ciclistico d'Italia
1st Stage 11 (ITT)
 4th Overall Circuit Cycliste Sarthe
1st Stage 3
 4th Overall GP Tell
1984
 3rd Overall Vuelta a Cuba
1st Stage 1
 6th Overall Tour de l'Avenir
1985
 3rd Overall Circuit Cycliste Sarthe
1986
 1st Stage 18 Vuelta a España
 1st Stage 3b (TTT) Tour de l'Avenir

References

External links
 

1962 births
Living people
Soviet male cyclists
Russian male cyclists
Sportspeople from Irkutsk
Russian Vuelta a España stage winners